Yaya Dillo Djérou is a Chadian politician, leader of the opposition.

Life 
On October 14, 2005, when the government of Idriss Déby had to admit desertions in the army, especially from the Zaghawa, the President's ethnic group. These deserters were under the leadership of Djérou; based in the Sudanese region of Darfur Djérou, a former telecommunications engineer, had left Déby's party MPS and became president of a revolutionary junta ("président du collège révolutionnaire") heading an organization called Platform for Change, Unity and Democracy (SCUD), a rebel alliance. The group has declared it plans to overthrow Déby, and is of zaghawa ethnicity. To open negotiations with the government, he has demanded that all political prisoners be freed.

He has successively left armed rebellion to become a cabinet minister in Déby's government.

On 28 February 2021, security forces raided Yaya Dillo Djérou's home in N'Djamena, killing five of his relatives, including his mother and son. A government statement says the raid is an operation to arrest Dillo. Two other people were also killed and five wounded in the ensuing fight. 

In March 2021, Yaya Dillo Djerou affirms that he will "take international justice" against the regime of Idris Déby.

References 

1976 births
Living people
Chadian rebels
Chadian Civil War (2005–2010)
Zaghawa people
Mining ministers of Chad
Energy ministers of Chad